Strzyżewice may refer to the following places:
Strzyżewice, Greater Poland Voivodeship (west-central Poland)
Strzyżewice, Łódź Voivodeship (central Poland)
Strzyżewice, Lublin Voivodeship (east Poland)